Thomas Mark Bradley (born July 12, 1956) is an American football coach and former collegiate player. He most recently served as the defensive backs coach for the Pittsburgh Steelers. Before joining the Steelers, he was the defensive coordinator for the UCLA Bruins football team. Before arriving at UCLA Bradley served as the senior associate head coach of the West Virginia Mountaineers football team.  He is best known for his four-decade association with Penn State Nittany Lions football as a player and coach. Bradley served as the interim head coach of Penn State following Joe Paterno's dismissal nine games into his 46th season as head coach and left the Penn State program in 2012. Bradley has participated in a remarkable 34 bowl games. He played in four as a player at Penn State, twenty-seven coaching at Penn State, one coaching at West Virginia, and two coaching at UCLA. 

Bradley has been recognized for his defense's outstanding performances. He was named the Associated Press Defensive Coordinator of the Year in 2005 and was named Rivals.Com Defensive Coordinator of the Year in 2008. Additionally Rivals.com had Bradley ranked as the 2nd best defensive coordinator in the nation before he was named interim head coach in 2011.

From 2004 to 2011 Penn State's defense ranked 3rd in the nation in scoring defense (16.4 ppg) and was 5th in total defense (298.7 ypg). In 2009, the Nittany Lions ranked in the top 15 nationally in the six primary defensive categories. Additionally, from 2004 to 2009 Penn State finished in the top 15 in total and scoring defense. From 2004 through most of the 2011 season, Penn State held 53 of its 88 opponents to 17 points or fewer. 10 of those 53 came in Penn State's illustrious 2009 campaign.

Bradley was inducted into the Cambria County Hall of Fame in 1998, and served as the honorary chair of the Special Olympics in 2006. He was inducted into the Western Pennsylvania Sports Hall of Fame in May 2014, and is a member of the 2020 Pennsylvania Sports Hall of Fame class.  He was also inducted into the Pittsburgh Athletic Association Hall of Fame in January 2015, where he is one of only four collegiate football coaches to receive this honor.

Coaching career
Bradley was named a graduate assistant for the 1979 season immediately following his graduation from Penn State in 1978. He became a full-time assistant midway through the 1979 season.  Over the next 20 years, he coached running backs, wide receivers, defensive backs, linebackers, and special teams.  In 1999 Bradley was named defensive coordinator at Penn State.

Bradley was a highly successful recruiter in addition to his role defensively. He served as lead recruiter for Nittany Lions such as Shane Conlan, Lavar Arrington, Paul Posluszny, Sean Lee, Brandon Short, and Justin King. Bradley has coached many All-American and all Big Ten standouts including Lavar Arrington, Paul Posluszny, Dan Connor, Devon Still, Shane Conlan, and David Macklin. Bradley was a part of 31 Bowl Games at Penn State.

Through the years Bradley remained loyal to Penn State and Paterno, and it was widely rumored that Paterno was preparing him to be his successor. Bradley's feelings about coaching at Penn State or another school have been quoted, "there's a lot of loyalty that has been built up over the years. There's a family atmosphere between the staff, the players, and the community. It's a place that means a lot to my family. I don't want to go be a head coach just to say I've been a head coach. That's never been part of it. If I find something better, I'll go. But I haven't found it. It's that simple."

In January 2011, Bradley was reported to have been interviewed as a candidate for the head coaching openings at the University of Pittsburgh, and Temple University, but Bradley ultimately remained on Penn State's staff for 2011.  On November 9, 2011, Bradley was named Penn State's interim head coach after the university's board of trustees fired Paterno. He coached Penn State for the final four games of the season, including the 2012 TicketCity Bowl.

On January 7, 2012, Bradley resigned from the Penn State coaching staff after not being named head coach, having spent 37 years at Penn State as a player, graduate assistant and full-time assistant.

Bradley spent two years as the football color analyst for CBS Sports before being hired by West Virginia University's Dana Holgorsen as senior associate head coach on February 21, 2014.  Bradley coached the defensive line, specifically.

On February 23, 2015, Bradley was hired to be the defensive coordinator for the UCLA Bruins.

On February 8, 2018, Bradley was hired to be the defensive backs coach for the Pittsburgh Steelers.

On January 14, 2021, the Pittsburgh Steelers announced that they wouldn't renew Bradley's contract.

Personal life
Bradley is the second-oldest of seven children. He graduated from Bishop McCort High School in Johnstown, Pennsylvania, in 1974, where he played basketball and football. Tom was a three-year letterman in football and a captain his senior year.  His father, Sam, played basketball for the University of Pittsburgh. His older brother Jim was a captain and standout defensive back at Penn State from 1971 to 1974, played for the Cincinnati Bengals, and is the long-time team orthopedic surgeon for the Pittsburgh Steelers. His younger brother Matt played linebacker for the Nittany Lions from 1978 to 1981. Matt briefly played for the Houston Oilers and the Philadelphia Stars of the USFL. Bradley's nephew, Jim Kanuch, also played receiver at Penn State from 2002 to 2005. His two sisters Patty and Cassy were All-American track athletes at Villanova.

Bradley is a graduate of Penn State and played for the Penn State Nittany Lions football team from 1975 to 1978 as a defensive back. Bradley was given the nickname "Scrap" by teammates due to his tenacious play. In 1978 the Nittany Lions special teams adopted the name, calling themselves the "Scrap Pack." Fans printed t-shirts and bumper stickers honoring them. Bradley helped lead the Lions to 38–10 record during his playing career, including two Sugar Bowls, a Fiesta Bowl and a Gator Bowl. He received a bachelor's degree in business administration and completed a master's in sports administration, later becoming a full-time coach after graduation.

Head coaching record

Notes

References

External links

 UCLA profile

1956 births
Living people
American football defensive backs
College football announcers
Penn State Nittany Lions football coaches
Penn State Nittany Lions football players
Pittsburgh Steelers coaches
UCLA Bruins football coaches
West Virginia Mountaineers football coaches
Sportspeople from Johnstown, Pennsylvania
Coaches of American football from Pennsylvania
Players of American football from Pennsylvania